The Cioloș Cabinet was the 125th Government of Romania. It was led by Dacian Cioloș, who was appointed Prime Minister of Romania on 10 November 2015, after the resignation of Victor Ponta amid mass protests against generalised corruption linked to the Colectiv nightclub fire. It consisted of 21 ministers. No member of the Cabinet was formally affiliated with a political organisation (except for a PSD minister).

History 
After the resignation of Victor Ponta amid November 2015 protests, President Klaus Iohannis nominated on 10 November Dacian Cioloș, former Romanian Minister of Agriculture and European Commissioner, to form a new government. Five days later, Cioloș presented the list of proposed ministers. Two of the initial nominees, Andrei Baciu for the Ministry of Health and Cristina Guseth for the Ministry of Justice, were withdrawn.

The Cioloș Cabinet received the vote of confidence from the Parliament of Romania on 17 November, the result being 389 votes "for", 115 "against" and two invalid votes. In his speech to senators and deputies, the premier stated that his team did not want to and could not replace the political class, alluding to criticism raised by Călin Popescu-Tăriceanu and other MPs who said that the technocratic formula practically abolished the parliament.

Composition

References

External links 
 List of ministers on gov.ro

2015 establishments in Romania
2017 disestablishments in Romania
Cabinets established in 2015
Cabinets disestablished in 2017
Cabinets of Romania